= Acting major =

Acting major may refer to:

- Acting rank of Major, a military rank
- Acting academic major
